The 1942–43 Coppa Italia was the 10th edition of the tournament and the last before the suspension of football competitions in Italy due to World War II related events. The Coppa Italia would have restored only several years later, in the summer of 1958.

All teams from Serie A (16) and Serie B (18) took part to this competition. After a short elimination round, 32 clubs were admitted to the final phase. All the matches were played in a single leg with eventual replay on the model of the FA Cup, homefields were decided by drawing except for the final match in Milan.

The trophy was won by Torino, which defeated 4–0 Venezia in the final match, played at the San Siro in Milan on May 30, 1943. This was Torino's second victory in the Coppa Italia. Top scorers of the competition were Bruno Ispiro (Genova 1893), Valentino Mazzola (Torino) and Vittorio Sentimenti (Juventus). Sentimenti scored all his 5 goals in the match against MATER.

Palermo–Juve, which won his round of 16 match because of Venezia forfeit, had been excluded from the competition before the round of 8 because of the imminent Allied invasion of Sicily.

Serie B elimination round

Knockout stage
30 clubs are added.

Legend

Final

Top goalscorers

Sources
Almanacco Illustrato del Calcio–La Storia 1898–2004, Panini Edizioni, Modena, September 2005

External links
1942–43 Coppa Italia on RSSSF.com

Coppa Italia seasons
Coppa Italia
Coppa Italia